Glenn Maxwell Robbins (born 30 December 1957) is an Australian comedian, writer, actor, television and radio presenter. Robbins has appeared on The Panel, Thank God You're Here and Have You Been Paying Attention?. He is best known for The Comedy Company, portraying Kel Knight in Kath & Kim and adventurer Russell Coight in All Aussie Adventures.

Robbins attended Strathmore High School and graduated in 1975. He later studied drama and media at the Melbourne State College and graduated with a Bachelor of Education degree in 1979. He first moved into performing in 1981.

Career

Television
Robbins began his acting career in 1984, appearing in two episodes of Prisoner. In 1985 he appeared on the sketch show The Eleventh Hour. He shot to fame in 1988 when he starred in another sketch show, The Comedy Company, in which one of his characters, "Uncle Arthur", became very popular. In 1991 he joined the team of Fast Forward for two seasons. Other sketch shows in which he has appeared include Full Frontal (1993), Jimeoin (1994–95) and Something Stupid (1998).

In 1998, Robbins became a panellist on the weekly television show The Panel. This aired on Network Ten. The show lasted eight seasons, going into hiatus in 2005.

Robbins played Australian adventurer Russell Coight in All Aussie Adventures from 2001 until 2002 and again in 2018 on Network Ten, as well as the 2004 telemovie.

From 2002, he played the role of Kel Knight in the television comedy series Kath & Kim. He also appeared in the Da Kath & Kim Code telemovie in 2005. The series ended in 2007.

In 2006, Robbins appeared in two episodes of Network Ten's Thank God You're Here. He is executive producer of the Network 10 sketch comedy show The Ronnie Johns Half Hour. In 2008, he launched a new game show on the Seven Network entitled Out of the Question. In 2011 he was the guest on the fourth episode of the comedy program The Joy of Sets on the Nine Network.

From 2013, Robbins has appeared in the ABC comedy series Upper Middle Bogan as Wayne Wheeler, and has a semi-regular guest spot on Have You Been Paying Attention?.

Film
In 2001, Robbins played the role of Pete O'May in the award-winning Australian film Lantana. In 2006 he co-starred with Mick Molloy in the comedy feature BoyTown as an '80s pop-star called "Benny G.". In 2011 he appeared in the comedy Scumbus. In 2012 he reprised his role of Kel Knight in the movie Kath & Kimderella.

Radio
Robbins has a weekly one-hour radio segment on Melbourne radio station 3AW as part of The Weekend Break with Grubby and Dee Dee Sunday edition.

Awards
Robbins has been nominated at the Logies several times. He was nominated for Most Popular Actor in 2003 and 2004 for his role in Kath & Kim and again nominated in 2005 for his role in the telemovie Da Kath & Kim Code.

Personal life
The third son of Arthur and Gwen, Robbins is married to Selina, who is a nurse, and currently lives in Melbourne.

Filmography

Film

Television

Bibliography

Contributor

References

External links
 
 Working Dog television and film production company website
 Russell Coight's Celebrity Challenge satirical site

1956 births
Living people
Australian male comedians
Australian male film actors
Australian male television actors
Comedians from Melbourne
Australian television talk show hosts
20th-century Australian male actors
21st-century Australian male actors
Male actors from Melbourne